Kirov Railway Station is the primary passenger railway station for the city of Kirov in Russia and an important stop along the Trans-Siberian Railway.

Trains

Major domestic routes 
 Moscow — Vladivostok
 Moscow — Beijing
 Moscow — Ulaanbaatar
 Moscow — Perm
 Moscow — Novy Urengoy
 Moscow — Khabarovsk
 Novosibirsk — Minsk
 Moscow — Ulan Ude
 Kirov — Saint Petersburg
 Adler — Vorkuta

International routes

References

Railway stations in Kirov Oblast
Trans-Siberian Railway
Railway stations in the Russian Empire opened in 1899
1899 establishments in the Russian Empire
Gorky Railway